The 2022 Big South Conference baseball tournament will be held from May 25 through 28.  The top six regular season finishers of the conference's eleven teams will meet in the double-elimination tournament to be held at Truist Point in High Point, North Carolina.  The tournament champion will earn the conference's automatic bid to the 2022 NCAA Division I baseball tournament.

Seeding and format
The top six finishers of the league's eleven teams qualify for the double-elimination tournament. Teams are seeded based on conference winning percentage, with the first tiebreaker being head-to-head record.

Results

Schedule

References

Tournament
Big South Conference Baseball Tournament
Big South baseball tournament